Panamius is a genus of cichlid fish from moderately flowing rivers and streams in Panama. The only species within Panamius is Panamius panamensis. Panamius had been previously considered a subgenus within the genus Cryptoheros. Prior to being classified within Cryptoheros it was sometimes included within the genus Neetroplus.

References

Cichlid genera
Monotypic fish genera
Heroini
Fish of Central America